Three Seven Eleven is a children's drama series broadcast on CITV from 17 February 1993 and to 15 June 1994, set in the fictional Barton Wood Primary School in England. It follows the day-to- day adventures of several students. It was written by Bernard Ashley, Chris Ashley (author) and Marvin Close.
It was filmed at Callands County Primary School in Callands, Warrington

The series was produced by Granada Television.

External links
 

1993 British television series debuts
1994 British television series endings
1990s British children's television series
ITV children's television shows
ITV television dramas
Television shows produced by Granada Television
Television series by ITV Studios
English-language television shows
Television shows set in Manchester